Məliklər (also, Meliklyar) is a village and municipality in the Davachi Rayon of Azerbaijan.  It has a population of 326.

References 

Populated places in Shabran District